The Overload is the debut studio album by British rock band Yard Act. The album was released on 21 January 2022 through Island Records. The album was nominated for the 2022 Mercury Prize.

Background and recording 
The album was written and recorded in 2021.

Release and promotion

Singles 
Five singles were released on The Overload from late 2021 to early 2022. The self-titled track, "The Overload" was released on 7 September 2021. The second single, "Land of the Blind", was released on 28 October 2021. "Payday" was released on 23 November 2021. The two 2022 singles were "Rich" and "Pour Another".

Music videos 
Corresponding with the single, the music video for the self-titled track, "The Overload", was released on the band's Vevo on 7 September 2021. The video features the band performing at a Car Boot Sale. The video was directed by James Slater. Slater also directed the music videos for their second and fourth singles, "Land of the Blind" and "Rich", respectively. In an interview with DIY, lead singer James Smith notes, "I had the idea for a music video in which a magician does tricks but everybody keeps applauding. I thought it was too on the nose to be a decent satire but I’ve been subtle in the past and nobody has picked up on it so this time I thought we would just be blunt. James [Slater] developed the idea and came up with the concept of the magician holding the cafe hostage via hypnosis."

Critical reception 

The Overload received widespread critical acclaim upon its release. On review aggregator website, Metacritic, The Overload has an average rating of 86 out of 100, indicating "universal acclaim" based on 14 critic reviews. Additionally, on AnyDecentMusic? the album holds an 8.0 out of 10 rating.

Track listing

Charts

References

External links 
 The Overload at Bandcamp
 

2022 debut albums
Yard Act albums
Island Records albums